Moritz Schularick (born 1975) is a German economist, who is Professor of Economics at Sciences Po Paris and the University of Bonn. He works in the fields of macrofinance, banking and financial stability, as well as international finance, political economy, and economic history.

Career 
Schularick studied at the University of Paris-VII from 1996 and received the Maîtrise there in 1998. He then transferred to the London School of Economics on a DAAD scholarship, where he received an M.Sc. in 1999. He completed a third degree (M.A.) at the Humboldt University of Berlin in 2000.

In 2005, he received his Ph.D. at Free University of Berlin, where he also taught as an assistant professor from 2007 until he received an appointment at the University of Bonn in 2012. Since then, he has been teaching and conducting research there as a W3 professor of macroeconomics. In 2008/09, Schularick went to University of Cambridge as a visiting professor, and in 2011/2012 to the New York University Stern School of Business. In the 2015/16 academic year, he was Alfred Grosser Professor at the Institut d'études politiques (Sciences Po) in Paris. In 2018, Schularick was elected to the Berlin-Brandenburg Academy of Sciences and Humanities. Since 2021, in addition to his professorship at the University of Bonn, he is also Professor of Economics at Sciences Po.

He is one of the recipients of the 2022 Leibniz-Prize, Germany's most prestigious research prize awarded by the German Research Foundation (DFG).

Research 
Schularick's research focuses on monetary macroeconomics, international economics and economic history. His work on credit cycles, asset prices, and financial stability has formed the background for the so-called macroprudential policy aimed at curbing credit boom. His studies on the causes of financial crises and the transformation of the financial system are among the most internationally cited macroeconomic papers of the last decade.

In 2012, he received a Schumpeter Fellowship from the Volkswagen Foundation to study the financial side of globalization, what he calls financialization.

Schularick's work on China-America economic relations, the causes of populism, and returns on various asset classes has also attracted considerable interest among experts and in the media. Named articles by Schularick have appeared in The New York Times, the Financial Times, and the Süddeutsche Zeitung, among others.

Awards 

 2018: Gossen Prize of the Verein für Socialpolitik
 2022: Leibniz Prize

Works 

 Òscar Jordà, Martin Kornejew, Moritz Schularick, Alan Taylor: Zombies at Large: Corporate Debt Overhang and the Macroeconomy. In: Review of Financial Studies, forthcoming.
 Moritz Schularick: Der entzauberte Staat. Was Deutschland aus der Pandemie lernen muss. C. H. Beck, München 2021, .
 Lucas ter Steege, Moritz Schularick, Felix Ward: Leaning Against the Wind and Crisis Risk. In: American Economic Review: Insights, 2021.
 Òscar Jordà, Björn Richter, Moritz Schularick, Alan Taylor: Bank Capital Redux: Solvency, Liquidity, and Crisis. In: Review of Economic Studies, 2021, 88: 260–286.
 Moritz Kuhn, Moritz Schularick, Ulrike Isabel Steins: Income and Wealth Inequality in America, 1949–2016. In: Journal of Political Economy, 2020, .
 Alina Bartscher, Moritz Kuhn, Moritz Schularick: The College Wealth Divide: Education and Inequality in America, 1956–2016. In: Federal Reserve Bank of St. Louis Review 102(1), 2020, S. 19–49, .
 Katharina Knoll, Moritz Schularick and Thomas Steger: No Price Like Home, American Economic Review, 2017, 107: 331–353.
 Manuel Funke, Moritz Schularick, Christoph Trebesch: Going to Extremes: Politics after Financial Crises, European Economic Review, 2016, 88: 227–260.
 Òscar Jordà, Moritz Schularick, Alan Taylor: The Great Mortgaging: Housing Finance, Crises, and Business Cycles, Economic Policy, 2016, 85: 107–152
 Òscar Jordà, Moritz Schularick, Alan Taylor: Betting the House, Journal of International Economics, 2015, 96: 2–18.
 Òscar Jordà, Moritz Schularick, Alan Taylor: Leveraged Bubbles, Journal of Monetary Economics, 2015, 76: 1–20.
 Moritz Schularick, Alan Taylor: Credit Booms Gone Bust: Monetary Policy, Leverage Cycles, and Financial Crises, American Economic Review, 2012, 102: 1029–1061.
 Niall Ferguson, Moritz Schularick: The End of Chimerica, International Finance, 2011, 14: 1–26.
 Niall Ferguson, Moritz Schularick: Chimerica and global asset markets. (PDF) 2006, accessed July 11, 2014.

Press 

 Svea Junge: Wirtschaftshistoriker mit Weitblick. In: FAZ. April 28, 2022.
 Martin Greive: Corona-Nachlese: Wenn der Staat nur bedingt einsatzbereit ist. In: Handelsblatt. October 17, 2021.
 Johannes Pennekamp: Willkommen im Dschungel. In: FAZ. July 18, 2021.
 Michael S. Derby: NY Fed Paper: Easy Monetary Policy Does Little to Cut Racial Income Inequality. In: The Wall Street Journal. January 29, 2021.
 Alexander Jung und Robin Wille: Wer mietet, verliert. In: Spiegel. December 27, 2019.
 Johannes Pennekamp: Am Häusermarkt braut sich etwas zusammen. In: FAZ. June 18, 2014.

References

External Links 
 Personal Website of Moritz Schularick
 CV of Moritz Schularick

1975 births
Living people